Bascanichthys paulensis is an eel in the family Ophichthidae (worm/snake eels). It was described by Margaret Hamilton Storey in 1939. It is a tropical, marine eel which is known from Sao Paulo, Brazil, in the western Atlantic Ocean.

References

Ophichthidae
Fish described in 1939